is a Japanese video game and software company. Founded in 1987 as Panther Studios Ltd., the company changed its name to Panther Software in 1991. They produced video games for the MSX, Sharp X68000, PlayStation, Dreamcast and Xbox.

Video games

Studio Panther
Tenkyuhai, MSX and Sharp X68000 (1989)
Tenkyuhai Special: Tougen no Utage, MSX (1989) and Sharp X68000 (1990)
Kami no Machi, MSX (1989)
Hana no Kiyosato: Pension Story, MSX (1989)
Ooedo Hanjouki, Sharp X68000 (1989)
Tenkyuhai Special: Tougen no Utage 2, MSX (1990)
Tenkyuuhai Special: Tougen no Utage Part 2 - Joshikousei Hen, Sharp X68000 (1990)

Panther Software
Joshua, Sharp X68000 (1992)
Ku2 Front Row, Sharp X68000 (1992)
Ku2, Sharp X68000 (1993)
Hamlet, NEC PC-98 (1993)
Space Griffon VF-9, PlayStation (1995)
Kitchen Panic, PlayStation (1998)
Twins Story: Kimi ni Tsutaetakute, PlayStation (1999)
Aoi Hagane no Kihei: Space Griffon, Dreamcast (1999)
Metal Dungeon, Xbox (2002)
Braveknight, Xbox (2002)
Aoi Namida, Xbox (2004)
Kana: Little Sister, Xbox (Cancelled)

External links
 
Panther Software at Neoseeker
List of Studio Panther/Panther Software games at GameFAQs
List of Panther Software games at Giant Bomb
Panther Software at MobyGames

Video game companies of Japan
Video game development companies
Video game publishers
Video game companies established in 1987